"Jumping Someone Else's Train" is a song by English rock band The Cure. Produced by Chris Parry, it was released on 2 November 1979 in the UK as a stand-alone. It later appeared on the US version of the band's debut album, Boys Don't Cry (1980).

History

During live performances, mostly during 1979 and 1980, the group would often segue into the instrumental "Another Journey by Train" after finishing this song. Also, they would occasionally segue into "Grinding Halt" from their debut album Three Imaginary Boys. Siouxsie Sioux contributed backing vocals to the B-side "I'm Cold".

Music video

The music video shows a speeded up view from the driver's cab of a train journey from London Victoria to Brighton Station.

Cover versions 

The song was covered by the Brooklyn-based band Luff for the 2008 American Laundromat Records tribute album Just Like Heaven - A Tribute to The Cure and by Army Navy on Manimal Vinyl's tribute Perfect as Cats: A Tribute to The Cure. The song was also covered by American noise rock band Whores for the band's 2014 split single with Rabbits, consisting entirely of Cure covers.

Track listing

7" vinyl

 "Jumping Someone Else's Train"
 "I'm Cold"

Personnel

 Michael Dempsey – bass
 Robert Smith – guitar, vocals
 Lol Tolhurst – drums
 Siouxsie Sioux – backing vocals on "I'm Cold"

See also
List of train songs

References

External links
 

The Cure songs
1979 singles
Songs written by Robert Smith (musician)
Songs about trains
Songs written by Michael Dempsey
Songs written by Lol Tolhurst